Jorge González Díaz (born 14 September 1974), known as Yordi, is a Spanish retired professional footballer who played as a striker.

A journeyman, he amassed La Liga totals of 180 games and 37 goals during ten seasons, in representation of five teams (notably Zaragoza), and 161 matches and 61 goals in Segunda División.

In 2002, Yordi had a six-month spell in England with Blackburn Rovers.

Career
Born in San Fernando, Cádiz, Andalusia, Yordi started his professional career with Sevilla FC, moving in 1996 to Atlético Madrid. He spent the vast majority of his only season with the Colchoneros with the B-team, winning the Pichichi Trophy award in Segunda División and being called up two the main squad only twice, once for the UEFA Champions League; on 23 June 1997, he played 30 minutes in a 3–0 home loss against CD Tenerife, in the last matchday.

In the summer of 1997, Yordi signed with Real Zaragoza where he stayed for seven seasons, one in the second level, being a very important attacking contributor although almost always off the bench: in 2000–01, for instance, as the Aragonese side won the Copa del Rey, he only started in ten of 31 La Liga matches, scoring four times for a final 17th position – barely out of the relegation zone.

In February 2002, Zaragoza loaned Yordi to Blackburn Rovers. During his time at Ewood Park, he came on as a substitute as his team won the 2002 Football League Cup and also netted twice in the Premier League, against Southampton and Middlesbrough. Subsequently, he returned to his country and represented Getafe CF and RCD Mallorca, appearing sparingly for the latter club (both in the top level).

32-year-old Yordi slightly revived his career with Xerez CD, in division two. After a poor first season, he was the competition's top scorer in 2007–08, netting 20 goals as the Andalusians barely avoided relegation while also adopting Jorge as his shirt name.

On 19 July 2008, Yordi left Xerez and signed for another side in the region, Córdoba CF (also in the second tier), retiring at the end of the campaign at the age of 34.

Honours
Zaragoza
Copa del Rey: 2000–01, 2003–04

Blackburn Rovers
League Cup: 2001–02

Individual
Pichichi Trophy (Segunda División): 1996–97, 2007–08

References

External links

1974 births
Living people
People from San Fernando, Cádiz
Sportspeople from the Province of Cádiz
Spanish footballers
Footballers from Andalusia
Association football forwards
La Liga players
Segunda División players
Segunda División B players
Sevilla Atlético players
Sevilla FC players
Atlético Madrid B players
Atlético Madrid footballers
Real Zaragoza players
Getafe CF footballers
RCD Mallorca players
Xerez CD footballers
Córdoba CF players
Premier League players
Blackburn Rovers F.C. players
Spanish expatriate footballers
Expatriate footballers in England
Spanish expatriate sportspeople in England